Cedar Grove is a historic plantation house located near Huntersville, Mecklenburg County, North Carolina. It was built between 1831 and 1833, and is a two-story, five bay by three bay, Greek Revival style brick mansion. It has gable roof and features high stepped brick end parapets that incorporate chimneys.  The front and rear facades have one-story, three bay porches supported by stuccoed brick Doric order columns.

It was listed on the National Register of Historic Places in 1972.

References

Plantation houses in North Carolina
Houses on the National Register of Historic Places in North Carolina
Greek Revival houses in North Carolina
Houses completed in 1833
Houses in Charlotte, North Carolina
National Register of Historic Places in Mecklenburg County, North Carolina
1833 establishments in North Carolina